Puri Lokanatha Temple is a Hindu Temple situated in the town of Puri, Odisha, India. It is dedicated to Lord Shiva. According to history the lingam in this temple was established by Lord Rama. The unique feature is that the Shivalinga is always under water which substantiates the legend that Goddess Ganga flows through the top of the shivalinga as a stream. The festival that is celebrated with great fervor and pomp is the Sankranti Somavar Fair while devotees believe that the shivalinga has powers to cure diseases after seeking the darshan of Lord Shiva. The utsava murti of Lokanatha is kept inside the Jagannath temple, Puri. He is the guardian deity of all the treasures and jewellery of Lord Jagannath. This temple is one of the five famous Shiva temple of Puri. Others are Markandeswara Temple, Jambeswar Temple, Banambara Temple and Kapalamochana Temple.

Festivals
Shivaratri and Mondays especially of the month of Vaishakha, Shraavana and Kartika.

References

External links
The wish-fulfilling deity of Puri
Guardian of all treasures

Hindu temples in Puri